"Present" was Bonnie Pink's sixth studio album released under the Warner Music Japan label on February 19, 2003.

Track listing

Charts

Album

Single

2003 albums
Bonnie Pink albums
Albums produced by Tore Johansson
Warner Music Japan albums